Prehnite is an inosilicate of calcium and aluminium with the formula: Ca2Al(AlSi3O10)(OH)2. Limited Fe3+ substitutes for aluminium in the structure. Prehnite crystallizes in the orthorhombic crystal system, and most often forms as stalactitic or botryoidal aggregates, with only just the crests of small crystals showing any faces, which are almost always curved or composite. Very rarely will it form distinct, well-individualized crystals showing a square-like cross-section, including those found at the Jeffrey Mine in Asbestos, Quebec, Canada. Prehnite is brittle with an uneven fracture and a vitreous to pearly luster. Its hardness is 6-6.5, its specific gravity is 2.80-2.90 and its color varies from light green to yellow, but also colorless, blue, pink or white. In April 2000, rare orange prehnite was discovered in the Kalahari Manganese Fields, South Africa. Prehnite is mostly translucent, and rarely transparent.

Though not a zeolite, prehnite is found associated with minerals such as datolite, calcite, apophyllite, stilbite, laumontite, and heulandite in veins and cavities of basaltic rocks, sometimes in granites, syenites, or gneisses. It is an indicator mineral of the prehnite-pumpellyite metamorphic facies. 

It was first described in 1788 for an occurrence in the Karoo dolerites of Cradock, Eastern Cape Province, South Africa. It was named for Colonel Hendrik Von Prehn (1733–1785), commander of the military forces of the Dutch colony at the Cape of Good Hope from 1768 to 1780.

It is used as a gemstone. 

Extensive deposits of gem-quality prehnite occur in the basalt tableland surrounding Wave Hill Station in the central Northern Territory, of Australia.

Gallery

See also

List of minerals
List of minerals named after people

References

Inosilicates
Calcium minerals
Aluminium minerals
Orthorhombic minerals
Minerals in space group 28
Gemstones